Lenka Krömrová is a Czech football goalkeeper, currently playing for FK Zlíchov 1914 in the third tier Czech Women's Football League.

Krömrová has played for the Czech national team. She made her debut for the national team on 28 November 2010 in a match against Hungary.

References

1992 births
Living people
Czech women's footballers
Czech Republic women's international footballers
Sportspeople from Ostrava
FK Dukla Prague players
Women's association football goalkeepers
SK Slavia Praha (women) players
Czech Women's First League players